"You Gotta Be" is an R&B/soul song by British singer and songwriter Des'ree, written by her with Ashley Ingram, who produced the song. It is the third track on the singer's second album, I Ain't Movin' (1994), and the opening track on the US release of that album. The song was released as a single in March 1994, becoming a top-40 hit in several countries, and a top-10 hit in the United States and Australia. By 13 June 1998, the single had sold 358,000 copies in United States, and it has received gold certifications in New Zealand and the United Kingdom.

The song was used in several television advertisements over the following years, and a 1999 remix used in a Ford Focus advert became a top-10 hit in Des'ree's native UK and a number-one hit in Spain. Q Magazine included "You Gotta Be" on their list of the "1001 Best Songs Ever" in 2003.

Background
Described by Stuart Elliott in The New York Times as "an infectiously sunny tune about the affirmative powers of self-confidence," "You Gotta Be" according to Des'ree is, like all the songs on its parent album, "about having the inner strength to figure out who you are" with "You Gotta Be" specifically being "born out of me stopping myself and thinking every day how you gotta be something. You have to be cool and calm in [one] situation, and then you have to be bold and strong in another situation." Des'ree drew inspiration for "You Gotta Be" from the Shakti Gawain book Creative Visualization which had abetted the singer's recovery from a painful romantic break-up; "I've always been blindly optimistic, and that [book] helped me rise from my melancholia," explains Des'ree who it is said "swears by daily affirmations."

Release
"You Gotta Be" was released several times in the United Kingdom: first on 28 March 1994, then on 27 February 1995 after it had become a US top-10 hit, and again on 22 March 1999 in a remixed version because of its use in the 1999 Ford Focus advertising campaign and following the success of Des'ree's previous singles "Life" and "What's Your Sign?". The latter release of "You Gotta Be" charted in its highest position out of all three releases in the United Kingdom, peaking at No. 10. This version, entitled the "1999 Mix" was added to a re-issue of her third studio album Supernatural. The original release first charted in September 1994 in the United States and slowly climbed the charts peaking at No. 5 in March 1995, and staying 44 weeks on the Billboard Hot 100. The remixed version of the song was a number-one hit in Spain for two weeks in February and March 1999.

Critical reception
AllMusic editor Tom Demalon described "You Gotta Be" as "uplifting", noting that it "best exemplified Des'ree's smooth blend of Pop-R&B music and power-of-positive thinking lyrical style." Larry Flick from Billboard wrote that the "adventurous artist" is pulling out an "percussive mover." He explained further, "Des'ree has a deep alto range and a compelling style that renders anything she sings a sophisticated musical gift. At a time when jockin' a new-jill-swing position is the name of the R&B radio game, single has an iffy future. Justice prevailing, though, programmers with minds of their own (and a modicum of good taste) will give this one a fair shot. Otherwise, punters should take this information and go find the album on their own. It's well worth the effort." Michele Romero from Entertainment Weekly declared the song as "deliciously hypnotic", adding that it "sounds like a mini-motivational seminar". Dave Sholin from the Gavin Report stated, "On her own this time around, she delivers a mid-tempo gem about being one's own person. The lyrics are positive and hopeful—perfect for summertime." 

Mike Wass from Idolator wrote, "A relentlessly upbeat self-help anthem with a mantra-like chorus, the track was a much-needed ray of light at the height of grunge, and can still be heard in lifts and doctor’s waiting rooms today." In his weekly UK chart commentary, James Masterton said, "The more I listen to this the more I am convinced it is a simple rewrite of her first hit "Feel So High"." Pan-European magazine Music & Media commented, "In her only two-year absence a whole new generation of soul dames have taken over her position of most promising newcomer. Gabrielle's "Dreams" must have been model for this reply." Alan Jones from Music Week wrote, "Folksily soulful in its original version, a remix adds a slow, muscular bass and other elements that leave it sounding like a suave second cousin to the Isley Brothers' "Between the Sheets"." John Kilgo from The Network Forty called it a "superb" track. Bob Waliszewski of Plugged In felt it is "heeding parental wisdom". Troy J. Augusto from Variety remarked its "fresh, infectious groove".

Music video
The accompanying music video for the song was directed by Paul Boyd; it was filmed in colour, but this was removed during post-production. It was nominated in the category of "Best Female Video" at the 1995 MTV Video Music Awards, but lost to Madonna's "Take a Bow".

Track listings

1994 release
 CD maxi – UK
 "You Gotta Be" – 4:04
 "Sun of 79" – 5:14
 "You Gotta Be" (Frankie Foncett mix) – 5:18
 "You Gotta Be" (After Hours mix) – 4:30

 CD maxi – UK
 "You Gotta Be"
 "You Gotta Be" (Blacksmith 7-inch radio edit)
 "You Gotta Be" (Blacksmith 12-inch mix)
 "Warm Hands, Cold Heart"

 12-inch maxi – UK
 "You Gotta Be" (Frankie Foncett mix)
 "You Gotta Be" (The Max)
 "You Gotta Be" (After Hours mix)
 "You Gotta Be" (Hourglass mix)
 "You Gotta Be" (Love Will Save the Day mix)

1995 release
 CD single 1 – Europe
 "You Gotta Be" – 4:01
 "Warm Hands, Cold Heart" – 4:35

 CD single 2 – Europe
 "You Gotta Be" – 4:01
 "Warm Hands, Cold Heart" – 4:35
 "Sun of 79" – 5:15

 CD maxi – Europe
 "You Gotta Be" – 4:03
 "You Gotta Be" (Blacksmith mix) – 5:29
 "You Gotta Be" (Frankie Foncett mix) – 5:18
 "You Gotta Be" (Love Will Save the Day mix) – 4:03

 12-inch maxi – UK
 "You Gotta Be" (Blacksmith mix)
 "You Gotta Be" (Frankie Foncett mix)
 "You Gotta Be" (Love Will Save the Day mix)

1999 mix
 CD single 1 – UK
 "You Gotta Be" (1999 mix) – 3:57
 "You Gotta Be" (Tin Tin Out remix)
 "Soul Paradise"

 CD single 2 – UK
 "You Gotta Be" (1999 mix) – 3:57
 "Life" – 3:36
 "You Gotta Be" – 4:06

 Cassette – UK
 "You Gotta Be" (1999 mix) – 3:57
 "You Gotta Be" – 4:06

Charts

Weekly charts

Original version

1999 mix

Year-end charts

Certifications and sales

Media appearances
In April 1994, it was used by Sky Movies, for their summer preview commercial. In March 1995, ABC began airing an ad campaign for Good Morning America, aimed at attracting a younger demographic and also boosting male viewership, in which Des'ree's "You Gotta Be" played under scenes of "Americans immersed in morning rituals: commuters rushing, a young man shaving, school-bound children" intercut with shots of the Good Morning America hosts.

Also in 1995, the song and music video were parodied by Ellen Cleghorne (playing O. J. Simpson's first wife Marguerite Whitley but visually resembling Des'ree) during a Season 20 episode of Saturday Night Live. While Luscious Jackson were the musical guests that episode, Des'ree herself performed both the song and "Feel So High" as the musical guest two episodes later. The song was also used for Ford's Focus commercial between 1998 and 1999.

This song was featured in the films The Next Karate Kid and The Object of My Affection. It was also used in a special promo for PBS Kids shown every Martin Luther King Jr. Day between 2001 and 2006. A cover of the song was also featured in an episode of Don't Trust the B---- in Apartment 23.

After being dropped from Sony in 2004, Des'ree did not allow the use of the song in films, television shows (including Glee and Happy Endings) or commercials. However, upon her return to the music industry in 2019, the song was re-licensed, with the song being used in the film Captain Marvel and the episode of the TV show PEN15, "Dance".

A reworked version of this song was used in the Big Sing 2008. The Big Sing raised money for CLIC Sargent and Marie Curie with hundreds of schools singing this song at the same time across the United Kingdom and Republic of Ireland, breaking the record for "most people simultaneously singing the same song".

In 2019, the song was featured in an episode of the ABC series, Schooled. ABC used the song again in the series finale of Fresh Off the Boat, which aired in February 2020.

In 2021, the song was featured in CW's The Flash, covered by Mel B in an episode of Antena 3's Spanish adaptation of The Masked Singer, and featured in a mashup with Janet Jackson's Rhythm Nation in the 2021 adaptation of Cinderella, sung by Camila Cabello, Idina Menzel and the ensemble cast.

In 2022, the song was again covered in The Lake, S1E5. It was sung by Billie, played by Madison Shamoun

References

1994 singles
1994 songs
1995 singles
1998 singles
1999 singles
2019 singles
550 Music singles
Black-and-white music videos
Bombs Away (group) songs
Des'ree songs
Epic Records singles
Music videos directed by Paul Boyd
Number-one singles in Spain
Songs written by Ashley Ingram
S2 Records singles